Magic Boy Kitchener is a Chinese animated series, made of 132 consecutive episodes, currently broadcast on CCTV.

Brief Introduction

Synopsis 
The series takes place in the late Qing dynasty, during the era of the Empress Dowager Cixi. The protagonist, Fugui learns the cooking skills from his grandfather when he is growing up, and he respects his grandfather very much. After a convoy accident in which the imperial kitchener perishes, Cixi searches for a new kitchener from the country. She sends her eunuchs to a nearby town, where they find a small tavern with a skilled elderly chef - the grandfather of Fugui. His grandfather is taken away by the eunuchs and is involved in a plot, leaving only one option for Fugui - becoming the imperial kitchener, thereby saving the life of his grandfather.

To return grandpa an innocent reputation and reunite with him, Fugui starts his journey. He needs to obtain 18 gold kitchen utensils to beat all the others cooks who also tries to become the Dowager's new cook. Fugui naturally attracts the attention of the villain K, and Fugui also becomes the opponent that K wants to eliminate. In the way of adventure, Fugui gets acquainted with Feidie who wants to assassinate Empress Dowager Cixi to avenge for parents. They help each other and become good friends. Fugui also makes many other friends such as Guangxu Emperor, Xiao Lizi, and old imperial physician. In the end, K successfully accomplishes his conspiracy, and he kills both Fugui's grandfather and the old imperial physician; Feidie also leaves the imperial palace because she is forced to marry K's son. Finally, Fugui is extremely disappointed and rides away from these political conflicts.

Main Voice Actors

Characters Information

Music

Award and Nomination 
2007 Was selected as the fourth batch of Excellent Domestic cartoons in 2007 

In 2008, won the first prize of national children's program and animation—excellent animation in 2007

In 2008, won the "Five one Project" award of the tenth Spiritual Civilization construction animation project in Hunan Province

In 2009, won the best TV Animation award and the best Creative Award in the 4th China Jilin International Animation Exhibition

In 2009, was nominated for the "Golden Panda" Award of the 10th Sichuan TV Festival—best ANIMATED TV Series and best screenwriter

Selected as one of the first key animation products in China in 2010 

In addition, the image of "Little Fugui" won the top ten favorite cartoon images of audiences in 2011 "Beautiful Monkey Award"

Broadcast Ratings 
1. In August 2007, ‘Magic Boy Kitchener’ was hit by more than 500 TV stations across the country. When it was hit, the audience rating reached 11%, breaking the audience rating record again and becoming a popular animation.

2. In August 2007, ‘Magic Boy Kitchener’ was broadcast on Golden Eagle Cartoon. Since the broadcast, the audience rating has been rising steadily, reaching 1.8% on August 5, with a market share of 8.93%, ranking the first place in golden Eagle cartoon program. The audience rating of the program is also much higher than that of other children's programs broadcast at the same time.

3. In February 2008, 60 episodes of ‘Magic Boy Kitchener’ were aired on CCTV children's Animation Dream Factory, with an average audience rating of 4.72% (higher than the average audience rating of Animation Dream Factory which is 4.33%) and the highest audience rating was 5.85%. According to the information feedback of 33 major markets in China, the total audience rating of 23 markets is more than 10, which stands out among the regular children's programs and becomes the program with the highest broadcast rate and audience rating.

4. Since it was broadcast on CCTV 8 in 2011, ‘Magic Boy Kitchener’ has achieved an average audience rating of 0.42%, ranking first among all the programs on CCTV 8, and even the first among animation programs ever broadcast on the channel.

Evaluation 
"Magic Boy Kitchener" as a more targeted inspirational work for young people, will have a profound impact on the quality of education for the young. In the cartoon, Fugui and "Changjin" are similar, as they all have good personality of kindness, perseverance, and positive enterprising, which will encourage the majority of young people to make progress and work hard.

The content of the film is positive, its plot ups and downs, shaping the images of characters lively, like Fugui and Feidie, and other sincere good, brave and wise personalities. It is an inspirational animation with historical theme. (State Administration of Radio, Film and Television Review)

"Magic Boy Kitchener" riches Chinese cultural atmosphere, advocates spirit of striving for dream. It has an exquisite program production quality, and won the experts praise. Through the display of the legendary experience of rural teenager Fugui, who went through sufferings and tribulations and finally became successful, the spirit of fearless and persistent pursuit and unremitting self-improvement is promoted to the majority of teenagers.

"Its characters are not single young children, compared with the previous characters in fairy tale cartoon more real; They are more real, distinctive and more dramatic." (Evaluation of Peng Zhaoping, President of Hunan Children's Publishing House)

"Magic Boy Kitchener" inspires young people to forge ahead. The educational significance of the work was highly recognized by Zhang Zhaohui, deputy director of the Youth Department of the Youth League central Committee and deputy Director of the National Youth Working Committee.

Overview of Episodes

Miscellaneous 
Although the show is Chinese, they use simple English at times, such as "Yes", "Ok" or "No".
The character Xiao Lizi is a much younger version of Li Lianying, who was a real-life servant of the Empress Dowager Cixi until her death in 1908; Li Lianying died three years later in 1911, at the age of 62.
The show is supposed to be in the olden days, but sometimes they have parodies of modern inventions or they sing modern songs at time.

References 

1. 广电总局通知推荐2007年度第四批优秀国产动画片   （In Chinese）中央政府门户网站 [Retrieved 2015-11-22]

2.  文化部公布2010首批重点动漫产品 艺术中国腾讯动漫 （In Chinese）艺术中国  [Retrieved 2020-06-05]

3. “团团圆圆、小刺猬蓝豆豆、小福贵、杰米熊”等优秀国产原创动漫形象获此殊荣 （In Chinese）漫域 [Retrieved 2020-06-05]

4.  动画片《神厨小福贵》赢得专家盛赞 (In Chinese) 新浪新闻 [Retrieved 2020-06-02]

5.【动画】小福贵”堪比“大长今” 首部少年励志动画湖南造  ． （In Chinese）中国青年网 [Retrieved 2020-06-02]

External links
 Official site 

2007 Chinese television series debuts
2000s animated television series
China Central Television original programming
Chinese animated television series
Television series set in the Qing dynasty